The Albert River (Brataualung: Lurt'bit) is a perennial river of the West Gippsland catchment, located in the South Gippsland region of the Australian state of Victoria.

Course and features
The Albert River rises below Madalya, on the eastern slopes of the Strzelecki Ranges, in a state forestry area. The river descends  over its  course.

The Albert River sub-catchment area is managed by the West Gippsland Catchment Management Authority.

Etymology
In the Aboriginal Brataualung language the river is named as Lurt'bit, with no clearly defined meaning.

The river was visited in 1841 by William Adams Brodribb, an early settler, and named in honour of Prince Albert.

See also

References

External links
 
 

West Gippsland catchment
Rivers of Gippsland (region)